Crews Hill railway station serves Crews Hill in the London Borough of Enfield, north London. The station, and all trains serving it, are operated by Great Northern. The station was opened on 4 April 1910.
It is the most northerly railway station in London.

Geography
The station is on an access road just off Cattlegate Road. A subway links the down (northbound) platform with the entrance on the up (southbound) side.

Services
All services at Crews Hill are operated by Great Northern using  EMUs.

The typical off-peak service in trains per hour is:
 2 tph to 
 2 tph to  via 

During the peak hours, the service runs between Moorgate and Hertford North only.

The station is unstaffed and there is no ticket machine available. As a result, the station is not a penalty fares station. 

Oyster pay as you go was introduced at this station on 2 January 2010.

References

External links

Railway stations in the London Borough of Enfield
Enfield, London
Former Great Northern Railway stations
Railway stations in Great Britain opened in 1910
Railway stations served by Govia Thameslink Railway
Crews Hill